Tom Horne Jr. is an American football coach.  He was the head football coach at the Valparaiso University in Valparaiso, Indiana, serving for 16 seasons, from 1989 to 2004, compiling a record of 67–101–1.

Head coaching record

College

References

Year of birth missing (living people)
Living people
Iowa Wesleyan Tigers football coaches
Salem Tigers football coaches
Valparaiso Beacons football coaches
Wisconsin–La Crosse Eagles football players
Junior college football coaches in the United States
People from Wauwatosa, Wisconsin
Sportspeople from Milwaukee
Players of American football from Milwaukee